Henry Tarrant was a member of the Wisconsin State Assembly.

Biography
Tarrant was born on May 23, 1833 at Woolhampton in Berkshire in England. In 1850, he moved to Janesville, Wisconsin. After moving to Vernon County, Wisconsin and returning to Janesville, he settled in La Prairie, Wisconsin.

On December 26, 1857, he married Margaret Jane Arnold. Both Tarrant and his wife were members of the Methodist Episcopal Church. They had ten children. He died on September 2, 1903 at his home in Janesville, Wisconsin from a heart ailment.

Career
Tarrant was a member of the Assembly from 1889 to 1893. Other positions he held include town clerk of La Prairie and county treasurer and chairman of the county board of supervisors of Rock County, Wisconsin. He was a Republican.

References

External links
RootsWeb

People from West Berkshire District
Politicians from London
19th-century English people
English emigrants to the United States
Politicians from Janesville, Wisconsin
People from Vernon County, Wisconsin
Republican Party members of the Wisconsin State Assembly
County supervisors in Wisconsin
City and town clerks
20th-century Methodists
1833 births
1903 deaths
Burials in Wisconsin
People from La Prairie, Wisconsin